Allotype may refer to:
 In zoological nomenclature, a designated paratype that is a specimen of the opposite sex to the holotype
 In biology, a variant protein sequence that is genetically determined, particularly:
 In immunology, an immunoglobulin allotype

See also
 Type (biology)
 Lectotype (zoology)
 Syntype (zoology)